Kara Weld is an American slalom canoeist who competed from the mid-1980s to the late 1990s. She won a bronze medal in the K1 team event at the 1991 ICF Canoe Slalom World Championships in Tacen. She is the co-owner of the company Immersion Research.

References

American female canoeists
Living people
Year of birth missing (living people)
21st-century American women